Francisco Javier 'Xavi' Pérez Pérez (born 26 February 1984 in Santa Margarida de Montbui, Barcelona, Catalonia) is a Spanish footballer. Mainly a central defender, he can also play as a defensive midfielder.

External links
 CF Gavà profile 
 HKFA profile 
 
 La Preferente Profile

1984 births
Living people
People from Anoia
Sportspeople from the Province of Barcelona
Spanish footballers
Footballers from Catalonia
Association football defenders
Tercera División players
CE Manresa players
FC Santboià players
CF Gavà players
Hong Kong First Division League players
Kitchee SC players
Liga 1 (Indonesia) players
Indonesian Premier Division players
Persijap Jepara players
Pro Duta FC players
Canadian Soccer League (1998–present) players
York Region Shooters players
Spanish expatriate footballers
Expatriate footballers in Hong Kong
Expatriate footballers in Indonesia
Expatriate soccer players in Canada
Spanish expatriate sportspeople in Indonesia
Spanish expatriate sportspeople in Canada